Shenzhen Bay Gymnasium is a new indoor arena located in Shenzhen, China.  It was completed in 2011 for the 2011 Summer Universiade.  It will host the basketball and gymnastics events.  The capacity of the arena will be 12,793 spectators and it opened in August 2011.

References

Indoor arenas in China
Sports venues in Shenzhen